The Archdeacon of Northumberland is a senior ecclesiastical officer within the Diocese of Newcastle. As such she or he is responsible for the disciplinary supervision of the clergy within the geographical area of the archdeaconry.

History
The first archdeacons in the diocese occur after the Norman Conquest – around the same time the post of archdeacon first started to occur elsewhere in England. There is no evidence of more than one archdeacon in the diocese until the mid-12th century, when two lines of office holders start to appear in sources. The titles "Archdeacon of Durham" and "Archdeacon of Northumberland" are not recorded until later in the century, although it is possible to discern which of the two lines became which post. Here are listed the archdeacons of the junior of two unnamed lines, then all those called Archdeacon of Northumberland.

The ancient Archdeaconry of Northumberland was part of the Diocese of Durham until 23 May 1882, when the Diocese of Newcastle was formed from it and the Archdeaconry of Lindisfarne.

List of archdeacons

High Medieval
Junior archdeacons
bef. 1127–aft. 1153: Ranulph
bef. 1155–aft. 1174: John
Archdeacons of Northumberland
bef. November 1174–aft. March 1195: William du Puiset
bef. April 1197–aft. 15 February 1203: G. de Perche
bef. 1 November 1211–May 1217 (res.): Richard Marsh (also Archdeacon of Richmond from February 1213)
bef. 1 June 1218–aft. 11 November 1239: Alan de Lenna
26 July 1241: unknown archdeacon
5 April 1249–bef. 13 January 1254 (d.): Thomas de Anesty
bef. 21 October 1256–bef. July 1257 (res.): Robert de Sancta Agatha
bef. 9 October 1264–bef. 1269: Roger de Herteburn
bef. 23 September 1271–: Richard de Middleton
bef. 8 November 1275–: Thomas de Birland
 (res.): William de la Corner
bef. 24 February 1291–: Nicholas de Welles

Late Medieval
4 March–December 1312 (d.): Robert Pickering
14 December 1312 – 1313 (res.): John de Nassington
?–1372 (res.): Thomas Charlton
February 1328 – 1340 (d.): John Charlton
5 April 1340–bef. 1349: Edmund Haward
bef. 1349–10 March 1362 (exch.): William de Salopia
10 March–bef. September 1362 (d.): John de Bamburgh
10 September 1362 – 17 August 1369 (exch.): Richard de Bernard Castle
17–18 August 1369 (res.): John de Kyngeston
19 August–26 November 1369 (exch.): Thomas Duffield
26 November 1369 – 23 January 1371 (exch.): William de Beverley
23 January 1371–?: John de Derby
: Louis Cardinal de Fieschi (cardinal-deacon of Sant'Adriano al Foro)
November 1400–?: John Repham
?–5 August 1405 (exch.): John de Dalton
5 August 1405–bef. December 1409: William Morwyk
5 December 1409 – 15 August 1410 (res.): John Rickingale
1 February–27 April 1411 (res.): Henry Eton
13 October–10 December 1411 (res.): John Akum
10 December 1411–bef. March 1422 (res.): John Rickingale (again)
27 March 1422 – 8 November 1427 (exch.): Marmaduke Lumley
9 November 1427–aft. 1435: Robert Burton
bef. 1456–bef. 1493 (d.): Robert Mason
February 1493–bef. 1528: Ralph Scrope
bef. March 1528–bef. 1558 (d.): Robert Davell

Early modern
 3 November 1558 – 25 September 1559 (deprived): William Carter (deprived)
 –bef. 1566 (deprived): William King (later canon at Windsor)
 21 August 1566–bef. 1573 (res.): Ralph Lever
 20 October 1573–bef. 1578: Francis Bunney
 25 September 1578 – 17 July 1581 (res.): John Bolde
 29 October 1581–?: Ralph Tunstall
 24 October 1599 – 1603 (res.): William Morton
 13 April 1604 – 6 August 1619 (res.): John Cradock
 7 August 1619 – 1620 (res.): Gabriel Clark
 13 September 1620 – 1633: Francis Burgoyne
 –bef. 1636 (res.): Joseph Naylor
 24 November 1636–?: William Flathers
 9 May 1638–bef. 1644 (d.): Everard Gower
 –12 October 1676 (d.): Isaac Basire (sequestered)
 30 October 1676 – 20 April 1685 (d.): William Turner
 5 October 1685 – 10 November 1722 (d.): John Morton
 27 February 1723 – 15 March 1758 (d.): Thomas Sharp
 17 August 1758 – 6 December 1761 (d.): Thomas Robinson
 21 April 1762 – 28 April 1792 (d.): John Sharp
 May 1792–20 April 1812 (d.): Robert Thorp
 May 1812–30 January 1826 (d.): Reynold Bouyer
 February 1826–13 March 1842 (d.): Thomas Singleton
 9 April 1842–bef. 1853 (res.): William Forbes Raymond
On 27 August 1842, an Order in Council divided the archdeaconry in two (effective that day), creating the new archdeaconry of Lindisfarne.
 24 February 1853 – 17 February 1880 (d.): George Bland

Late modern
1880–June 1882 (res.): Henry Watkins
1882–23 September 1905 (d.): George Hamilton
1906–1917 (ret.): James Henderson
1918–16 July 1931 (d.): Charles Blackett-Ord
1931–1939 (res.): Leslie Hunter
1939–1954 (res.): Charles Ritchie
1955–1963 (res.): Ian White-Thomson
1963–1982 (ret.): Christopher Unwin
1983–1992 (ret.): William Thomas (afterwards archdeacon emeritus)
1993–2005 (ret.): Peter Elliott
10 April 200520 October 2018: Geoff Miller (became Dean of Newcastle; Acting Dean, 4 February20 October 2018)
24 March 20195 January 2021: Mark Wroe (Acting since 4 February 2018; became Bishop of Berwick)
2021 onwards: Rachel Wood (Acting since 5 January 2021)

References

Sources

Northumberland
 
Northumberland-related lists